Beverly/Edgewater Park is a station on the River Line light rail system, located on Railroad Avenue in Beverly, New Jersey, USA.

The station opened on March 15, 2004. Southbound service from the station is available to Camden, New Jersey. Northbound service is available to the Trenton Rail Station with connections to New Jersey Transit trains to New York City, SEPTA trains to Philadelphia, Pennsylvania, and Amtrak trains. Transfer to the PATCO Speedline is available at the Walter Rand Transportation Center.

Though located in the City of Beverly, the station also serves the Township of Edgewater Park, hence the dual name. Nearby recreational facilities in Edgewater Park include Memorial Field, and the Roosevelt Park and Pond. Memorial Field is a proposed location for the Delaware River Heritage Trail.

Transfers 
 BurLink B4

References

External links

 Station from Cooper Street from Google Maps Street View

River Line stations
Railway stations in the United States opened in 2004
Railway stations in Burlington County, New Jersey
Beverly, New Jersey
2004 establishments in New Jersey